Prapreče is a settlement in the Municipality of Trbovlje in central Slovenia. A small part of the settlement also lies in the neighbouring Municipality of Zagorje ob Savi. The area is part of the traditional region of Styria. It is now included with the rest of the municipality in the Central Sava Statistical Region.

The local church is dedicated to Saint Agnes and belongs to the Parish of Zagorje ob Savi. It was rebuilt in the 19th century on the site of an earlier building.

References

External links
Prapreče on Geopedia

Populated places in the Municipality of Trbovlje